Herlitzius is a surname. Notable people with the surname include:

 Evelyn Herlitzius (born 1963), German opera singer
 Bettina Herlitzius (born 1960), German politician